767 may refer to:
 Boeing 767, a jet airliner
 767 (number)
 AD 767, a year in the 8th century.
 767 BC, a year in the 8th century BC
 Area code 767, an area code of the Commonwealth of Dominica
 767, the reserved exchange for 767-2676 or POPCORN, the time of day service in northern California